"She's Too Good to Be True" is a song written by Johnny Duncan, and recorded by American country music artist Charley Pride.  It was released in September 1972 as the first single from the album Songs of Love by Charley Pride.  The song was Pride's tenth number one on the country chart.  The single stayed at number one for three weeks and spent a total of fourteen weeks on the country chart.

Chart performance

References
 

1972 singles
1972 songs
Charley Pride songs
Songs written by Johnny Duncan (country singer)
Song recordings produced by Jack Clement
RCA Records singles